Senta (Hungarian: Zenta, ; Romanian: Zenta) is a town and municipality located in the North Banat District of the autonomous province of Vojvodina, Serbia. It is situated on the bank of the Tisa river in the geographical region of Bačka. The town has a population of 18,704, whilst the Senta municipality has 23,316 inhabitants (2011 census).

History

Archaeological finds indicate that the area around the modern settlement was populated from the prehistoric times. Neolithic and eneolithic societies settled in the vicinity of modern Senta thousands of years ago leaving credible traces of their presence. A Neolithic Tiszapolgár–Bodrogkeresztúr culture necropolis was found in Senta. The first historic population that might have lived in the area were most likely the Agathyrsi (6th century BC). With certainty we can claim that the inhabitants of the early "Senta" in the 6th century AD were Sarmatians, Slavs alike and Avars. Hungarian people invaded the area during the great breakthrough of the Magyars in the 9th century AD.

According to historic records, the town was mentioned first in 1216 under the name Szintarev. In this time, it was under administration of the medieval Kingdom of Hungary. The entire area was sacked by Mongols in 1241/42. After initial salvation, Senta saw more than two centuries of prosperity. Initially, the town was part of Bodrog county, but from 1246 it was part of the Csanad County, and later part of the Csongrád County. Records also indicate that from the year 1440 an area south of Senta called Peser was under the control of the Serbian despots. In the second half of the 15th century there occurred a brief conflict, a small war of sorts, with the rivaling community of Szeged. Nevertheless, in the year 1506 Senta became a royal free city, granted that by the Czech–Hungarian King Vladislav II Jagellion. By that time Senta had a fort, a harbour and a catholic monastery. The peasant rebellions of 1514 did not include Senta in the wake of destruction. Although still under administration of the Kingdom of Hungary in 1525 there was an autonomous Serb militia stationed in the fort. Autonomous in terms of command since on the list of officers one can clearly note that Serb units had their own commanding officers, most notably Mihailo Konjović and Stevan Brančić. After the Battle of Mohács in 1526 Senta was no longer under administration of the Kingdom of Hungary. In the brief period of the reign of Serb Emperor Jovan Nenad, Senta was part of Jovan Nenad's state and was a refuge for Serb forces. One may clearly acknowledge this due to the fact that after being seriously wounded in Szeged, Jovan Nenad and his guards retreated towards Senta, only to be intercepted by Hungarian forces and murdered in the village of Tornjoš. After Jovan Nenad was murdered and his state collapsed, Senta was again placed under administration of the Kingdom of Hungary, until it came under full Ottoman control in 1542. During Ottoman conquest, local Hungarian population left this area, which was then populated by Serbs who came from other parts of the Ottoman Empire.

During the second half of the 16th century and most of the 17th century Senta was under administration of the Ottoman Empire and the town and area were part of the Sanjak of Segedin. However, Ottomans only operated a garrison in the fort, while the population of settlement was Serb. The reputed traveler, Evliya Çelebi, visited Senta during his expeditions, and noted that it is a small place, quiet and calm with a fort, a mosque and a village with enough services to maintain itself. On the 15. October 1686 a skirmish between local Serb insurgence under Habsburg command and a smaller Ottoman force occurred. The event is known as the First Battle of Senta. From the year 1686 to the more commonly known Battle of Senta in 1697 the town and its surroundings were no longer under Ottoman control, but at the same time were neither controlled by the Habsburgs.

On 11 September 1697 Prince Eugene of Savoy defeated the Ottoman army in the Battle of Senta, which was fought at this location, and after the Treaty of Karlovci in 1699, the town was included into Habsburg monarchy as part of the Tisza–Maros section of the Military Frontier. Amongst those involved in the battle was skilled Serb officer, Captain and later Colonel Jovan Popović Tekelija, who after the conflict took command over part of the Frontier. During this period Senta was mainly populated by Serbs and had a small Orthodox church. It was well fortified and protected by organized units of Serb militia called Frontiersmen. After the abolishment of this part of the Frontier in 1751, Senta was included into District of Theiss, which was part of the Bács-Bodrog County of the Habsburg Kingdom of Hungary. Many of the Serbs that lived in the town, and that now considered themselves humiliated by being reduced from soldiers to farmers, emigrated either to other parts of the Habsburg monarchy where Military Frontier was still needed either to Russia (notably to New Serbia and Slavo-Serbia). One of the settlements in New Serbia was also named Senta by the Serb colonists.

During the 18th and 19th centuries, Hungarians, Slovaks, Germans, and Jews settled in the town. In 1848–1849 revolution, the town was alternately controlled by the forces of the Kingdom of Hungary and forces of the Serbian Vojvodina. From 1849 to 1860, it was part of the Voivodeship of Serbia and Banat of Temeschwar, a separate Austrian crown land. After abolishment of the voivodeship in 1860, Senta was again included into Bács-Bodrog County. In 1910, the population of the town numbered 29,666 inhabitants of whom 27,221 (91.8%) spoke Hungarian, 2,020 (6.8%) spoke Serbian, and 425 (1.4%) spoke other languages.

Serbs started to settle in the town in larger number again after the First World War, when Senta became part of the Kingdom of Serbs, Croats and Slovenes (later renamed to Yugoslavia) in 1918. From 1918 to 1922, the town was part of Novi Sad County, from 1922 to 1929 part of Belgrade Oblast, and from 1929 to 1941 part of Danube Banovina. From 1941 to 1944, Senta was occupied by the Axis troops and was attached to Horthy's Hungary. After the war, in 1944, Senta became part of the Autonomous Province of Vojvodina within new socialist Yugoslavia. From 1945 Vojvodina was part of the People's Republic of Serbia within Yugoslavia.

Inhabited places
Senta municipality includes the town of Senta and 4 villages. The villages are (Hungarian names are in italics):
Gornji Breg (Felsőhegy)
Bogaraš (Bogaras)
Tornjoš (Tornyos)
Kevi (Kevi)

Climate 
Climate in this area has mild differences between highs and lows, and there is adequate rainfall year-round. The Köppen Climate Classification subtype for this climate is "Cfb" (Marine West Coast Climate/Oceanic climate).

Demographics

According to the 2011 census results, the municipality of Senta has a population of 23,316 inhabitants.

Ethnic groups
All settlements in the municipality have Hungarian ethnic majorities.

The ethnic composition of the municipality:

Economy
The following table gives a preview of total number of registered people employed in legal entities per their core activity (as of 2018):

Notable citizens
Senta is the birthplace of many renowned people, including:
 Szilárd Mezei, composer
 Michael Fekete, mathematician
 Matija Bećković, writer and poet, member of the Serbian Academy of Sciences and Arts
 Jovan Đorđević, cultural benefactor, he is famous for writing the lyrics to the Serbian National anthem Bože pravde
 Bernat Klein, textile designer
 Árpád Sterbik, Serbian-Spanish handball goalkeeper, World champion
 Milorad Krivokapić, Serbian-Hungarian handball player
 Jovan Muškatirović, luminary
 Stevan Sremac,  realist and comedy writer
 Bojan Pajtić, politician, President of the Government of Vojvodina
 Attila Juhász, politician
 Jožef Tertei, wrestler, European champion and Olympic bronze medalist
 Viktor Nemeš, wrestler, World champion
 Kristijan Fris, wrestler, European champion
 Čaba Silađi, swimmer, European championships bronze medalist
 Nemanja Nikolić, Hungarian football player
 Zsombor Kerekes, Hungarian football player
 Silvija Erdelji, table tennis player, European championships bronze medalist
 Laslo Đere, tennis player

Twin towns - sister cities
Senta is twinned with:

 Cristuru Secuiesc, Romania
 Csorvás, Hungary
 Dabas, Hungary
 Dunajská Streda, Slovakia
 Dunaszentgyörgy, Hungary
 Gödöllő, Hungary
 Hódmezővásárhely, Hungary
 Kaszaper, Hungary
 Kranj, Slovenia
 Medijana (Niš), Serbia
 Mukachevo, Ukraine
 Tiszafüred, Hungary
 Törökszentmiklós, Hungary
 Várkerület (Budapest), Hungary

See also
List of Hungarian communities in Vojvodina
Battle of Senta

References

External links

 Official website
 Community Portal of Citizens
 Atila Pejin - Istorijat Sente / History of Senta 
 History of Senta 

 
Places in Bačka
Populated places in North Banat District
Municipalities and cities of Vojvodina
Hungarian communities in Serbia
Towns in Serbia